The following is a chronological list of Macedonian artists working in visual media. Sources of names, birth and death dates, and occupation are contained within individual pages.

19th century
Gavril Atanasov (1863-1945) painter
Dimitar Avramovski–Pandilov (1898-1963) painter

20th century 

Lazar Licenoski (1901-1964) painter
Nikola Martinoski (1903-1973) painter
Tomo Vladimirski (1904-1971) painter
Vangel Kodžoman (1904-1994) painter
Abdurrahim Buza (1905-1987) painter
Dimo Todorovski (1910-1983) artist, sculptor
Ljubomir Belogaski (1911-1994) painter
Keraca Visulčeva (1911-2004) painter, sculptor
Borislav Traikovski (1917-1996) painter
Janko Konstantinov (1926-2010) architect, painter
Dimitar Kondovski (1927-1993) painter, critic and professor
Petar Mazev (1927-1993) painter
Dušan Džamonja (1928-2009) sculptor
Petar Hadzi Boskov (1928-2015) sculptor
Ordan Petlevski (1930-1997) painter, drawing, graphic arts and illustration
Petar Gligorovski (1938–1995) painter, animated movie director
Kole Manev (1941-) painter
Angel Gavrovski (1942-) painter
Kiril Cenevski (1943-2019) film director
Kiro Urdin (1945-) visual, multimedia artist and film director
Apostol Trpeski (1948-) cinematographer
Rubens Korubin (1949-) painter
Stole Popov (1950-) film director
Mice Jankulovski (1954-) painter, cartoonist
Miroslav Grčev (1955-) architect, graphic designer, and caricaturist
Gligor Stefanov (1956-) sculptor and environmental installations artist
Zarko Baseski (1957-) sculptor
Vlado Goreski – Rafik (1958-) Sceneography, graphic art, theatre poster design
Milcho Manchevski (1959-) writer, director, photographer and artist
Nikola Eftimov (1968-) fashion designer, visual artist
Goran Trenchovski (1970-) director, writer
Darko Mitrevski (1971-) film director
Bobby Stojanov Varga (1972-) painter
Svetozar Ristovski (1972-) film director
Igor Ivanov Izi (1973-) film director
Maja Hill (1976-) painter, character animation, mosaics, sculpture, contemporary art
Goran Menkov (1987-) painter
Glisha Kostovski woodcarver
Nadja Petrovic (1991-), painter

Notes

See also 
Macedonian culture (Slavic)
Macedonian art (Byzantine)
Macedonian people

List
Artists
Macedonian artists